Lunatin  (3-methoxy-1,6,8-trihydroxyanthraquinone) is a derivative of anthraquinone. It is produced by the Senna reticulata tree and can be extracted by soaking the bark in alcohol. Lunatin is also produced by the fungus Curvularia lunata which inhabits a marine sponge. Lunatin is an antibacterial substance.

References

Anthraquinones